The 2011 PBA All-Star Weekend was the annual all-star weekend of the Philippine Basketball Association (PBA)'s 2010–11 PBA season. The events were held from May 18 to 23, 2011 at the Boracay Convention Center, Boracay, Aklan.

Friday events

Coca-Cola Obstacle Challenges
Time in seconds.

Gold color represent the current champion.

Maynilad Three-point Shootout

Gold color represent the current champion.

Meralco High-Voltage Slamdunk Contest

Jay Washington attended in Boracay, but did not compete in the slamdunk competition.
Slamdunk champion Niño Canaleta won't join this year's slamdunk competition.

Rookie-Sophomore Blitz Game

Rosters

Rookies:
Rey Guevarra (Petron Blaze Boosters)
Elmer Espiritu (Air21 Express)
Robert Labagala (Barangay Ginebra Kings)
Hans Thiele (Alaska Aces)
Josh Vanlandingham (Rain or Shine Elasto Painters)
Shawn Weinstein (Meralco Bolts)
John Wilson (Barangay Ginebra Kings)
Sean Anthony (Powerade Tigers)
Coach: Joshua Reyes (Talk 'N Text Tropang Texters)

Sophomores:
Josh Urbiztondo (Air21 Express)
Chris Ross (Meralco Bolts)
Jervy Cruz (Rain or Shine Elasto Painters)
Jerwin Gaco (B-Meg Derby Ace Llamados)
Emerson Oreta* (Talk 'N Text Tropang Texters)
Larry Rodriguez* (Rain or Shine Elasto Painters)
Coach: Gee Abanilla (Petron Blaze Boosters)

Third year pro Emerson Oreta and Larry Rodriguez were named to augment the Sophomores team replacing the injured Rico Maierhofer, Francis Allera and Marcy Arellano.

Game

In the game, there were four 10-minute quarters, the 8-second rule was lessened into 6 seconds, the shot clock was cut into 18 seconds, and a slam dunk counted for three points.

Sunday events

Legends shootout

Top 3 finalist in the three-point shootout will battle against the three shootout legend.

All-Star Game

Rosters

North All-Stars:

Starters
Marc Pingris (B-Meg Derby Ace Llamados)
Kerby Raymundo (B-Meg Derby Ace Llamados)
LA Tenorio (Alaska Aces)
Willie Miller (Barangay Ginebra Kings)
Gabe Norwood (Rain or Shine Elasto Painters)
Reserves
Rabeh Al-Hussaini (Petron Blaze Boosters)
Arwind Santos (Petron Blaze Boosters)
Alex Cabagnot (Petron Blaze Boosters)
Ranidel de Ocampo (Talk 'N Text Tropang Texters)
Harvey Carey (Talk 'N Text Tropang Texters)
Mark Cardona (Meralco Bolts)
JC Intal (Barangay Ginebra Kings)
Coach:Ato Agustin (San Miguel Beermen)

South All-Stars:

Starters
James Yap (B-Meg Derby Ace Llamados)
Jay Washington (Petron Blaze Boosters)
Kelly Williams (Talk 'N Text Tropang Texters)
Eric Menk (Barangay Ginebra Kings)
Cyrus Baguio (Alaska Aces)
Reserves
Jimmy Alapag (Talk 'N Text Tropang Texters)
Peter June Simon (B-Meg Derby Ace Llamados)
Asi Taulava (Meralco Bolts)
Dondon Hontiveros (Air21 Express)
Danny Seigle (Air21 Express)
Joe Devance (Alaska Aces)
Sonny Thoss (Alaska Aces)
Coach:Chot Reyes (Talk 'N Text Tropang Texters)

Game

Marc Pingris was named the game's most valuable player.

Notes

References

See also
2010–11 PBA season
Philippine Basketball Association
Philippine Basketball Association All-Star Weekend

Philippine Basketball Association All-Star Weekend
Sports in Aklan